Magraura is a town in Magraura Block, Pratapgarh district, Uttar Pradesh state, India.

References

Cities and towns in Pratapgarh district, Uttar Pradesh